NGC 350 is a lenticular galaxy in the constellation Cetus. It was discovered on September 27, 1864 by Albert Marth. It was described by Dreyer as "extremely faint."

References

External links
 

0350
18640927
Cetus (constellation)
Lenticular galaxies
003690